Jerry Harris (November 23, 1945February 11, 2016) was an abstract sculptor, collagist, and writer. Harris was primarily a constructivist sculptor, working in media such as wood, stone, bronze, fiberglass, clay, metal, mixed media (found objects), and collage.

Biography
Harris was born in Pittsburgh, Pennsylvania. After graduating from high school in Pittsburgh, he spent a year in Portland, Oregon with his uncle, professional wrestler and referee Shag Thomas.
Harris attended community college in Portland and then transferred to Tuskegee Institute in Alabama, and then San Francisco State University.

He then studied sculpture under James Lee Hansen, a leading Pacific Northwest sculptor who taught at Portland State University. Subsequently, Harris was accepted in the international sculptor's program at the St Martins School of Art in London, now Central Saint Martins College of Art and Design, where his teachers included Sir Anthony Caro, Phillip King, and Frank Martin. Harris also did special studies in bronze casting at the Central School of Art and Design under Henry Abercrombie.

Harris lived in Stockholm and Lund, Sweden, for many years until the death of his wife, Britt-Marie Olofsson-Harris, in 1996. He befriended many African-American visual artists while living in Sweden, such as Herbert Gentry and Harvey Cropper. In 1998 Harris returned to his hometown of Pittsburgh. He was elected into The Associated Artists of Pittsburgh, the nation's second-oldest artists' association, where he felt welcomed by the African-American sculptor Thaddeus Mosley. Harris later moved to Eugene, Oregon, and lived in Chico, California.

Since 1988 Harris was a member of the Swedish Sculptors Association. His sculptures are in many private national and international collections and in the permanent Swedish National Art Collection in Stockholm (Statenskonstrad). He exhibited throughout Sweden, elsewhere in Europe, and in the United States in various galleries and museums.

Harris died in Chico, California.

References

External links

 
 Article on Jerry Harris, accessed October 25, 2009
 Article on Jerry Harris, accessed January 23, 2008
 Video clips showing the art of Jerry Harris
 Jerry Harris' African American Art Blog
 Sweet Henry Magazine
 Harris, Jerry (2015) Mad Black Men and Swedes, 

1945 births
Living people
African-American contemporary artists
American contemporary artists
20th-century American sculptors
20th-century American male artists
21st-century American sculptors
21st-century American male artists
American male sculptors
American collage artists
Artists from Pittsburgh
People from Chico, California
Alumni of the Central School of Art and Design
Sculptors from Pennsylvania
African-American sculptors
20th-century African-American artists
21st-century African-American artists